Les Dalton means The Daltons in French.

Les Dalton may refer to:
 The Daltons (Lucky Luke), characters from the comic strip Lucky Luke
 Les Dalton (animated series), a 2009 French animation series, made by Xilam Studios
 "Les Dalton" (song), a 1967 song by Joe Dassin
 Les Dalton (film), a 2004 French film